Firbeix is a commune in the Dordogne department in Nouvelle-Aquitaine in southwestern France.

Geography
The Côle has its source near le Châtenet, a hamlet in the southern part of the commune; it forms part of the commune's southeastern border.

Population

See also
Communes of the Dordogne department

References

Communes of Dordogne